2010 President's Cup may refer to:

 2010 President's Cup (tennis)
 2010 President's Cup (Maldives), football